Cassius Marcellus Clay (November 11, 1912 – February 8, 1990) was an American painter and musician. He was the father of three-time World Heavyweight Champion Muhammad Ali and Rahman Ali, and the paternal grandfather of Laila Ali. He married Odessa Lee O'Grady in 1934 and worked as a painter. He was described as "a handsome, mercurial, noisy, combative failed dreamer" and a "hard-drinking, skirt-chasing dandy of a daddy". His son Muhammad Ali described him as "the fanciest dancer in Louisville".

Biography
Clay was born in Jefferson County, Kentucky, the son of Herman H. Clay (March 1876 – February 1, 1954) and Edith E. Greathouse (December 1889 – December 30, 1972). He was named in honor of the 19th-century Republican politician and staunch abolitionist, Cassius Marcellus Clay. He had a sister and four brothers, including Nathaniel Clay. Clay's paternal grandparents were John Clay and Sallie Anne Clay. His sister Eva said that Sallie was a native of Madagascar. According to DNA research, Muhammad Ali's paternal grandmother was Archer Alexander's (1815-1880) great-granddaughter. 

Clay painted billboards and signs. He also played the piano, took piano lessons and wrote music. Around 1933, he married Odessa Lee O'Grady. He was a heavy drinker, which led to legal entanglements for reckless driving, disorderly conduct, and assault and battery. When asked in 1970 why he had not become a Muslim as his son had done, he said: "my religion is my talent, that which supports me."

Clay died at the age of 77 on February 8, 1990, after suffering a heart attack while leaving a department store in Kentucky.

Legacy
Clay was portrayed by Arthur Adams in the 1977 film The Greatest and by Giancarlo Esposito in the 2001 Oscar-nominated film Ali.

References

External links
 

1912 births
1990 deaths
20th-century American painters
American male painters
American people of Malagasy descent
Muhammad Ali family
Artists from Louisville, Kentucky
African-American painters